Xiaotangshan Town  is a small town in the Changping District of Beijing, China. It lies immediately outside the Beijing 6th Ringroad, to the north of the city. According to the 2020 census, Xiaotangshan was home to 80,273 inhabitants.

With a total area of 70.1 square kilometers, Xiaotangshan has rich geothermal resources, so much so that the name Xiaotangshan originated from its abundance of geothermal springs.
Xiaotangshan Hospital appeared in the news in May 2003 when the government hastily built a 1000-bed field hospital there to deal with an outbreak of SARS.

History

Administrative divisions 
By 2021, Xiaotangshan Town was divided into 30 subdivisions, more specifically 6 communities and 24 villages:

Hot springs

Xiaotangshan has a long history of geothermal hot spring. The use of hot spring water can be traced back to the Southern and Northern Dynasties period of China, dating back over 1,500 years ago. The Xiaotangshan hot springs has records of early emperors using the springs for medical baths. The Qianlong Emperor of the Qing dynasty built the Xiaotangshan imperial palace and inscribed "九华兮秀". The hot spring water contains minerals and trace elements such as strontium, lithium, selenium, and other silicic acid mineral elements.

Xiaotangshan has rich geothermal resources. In Xiaotangshan center, resources are within 30 kilometers of ground water. Deep geothermal water depth in regions ranging from about 150–1400 meters to Xiaotangshan for the most shallow, less than one hundred meters. Due to the different regions and the depth of water, the water temperature is different, mostly in the 40-50 ℃, the highest in the central area of Xiaotangshan 55-64 ℃.

Economy

In 1994, Xiaotangshan town was named the pilot town for the construction of small towns in Beijing. In 1995, it was identified as the national pioneer town of comprehensive reform. In 2002, it was named by the United Nations Development as the small pilot town for sustainable development in China. In 2003 it was named "National Environmentally Beautiful Town" by the National Environmental Protection Administration. In 2004, it was identified as the first batch of national development and Reform pilot town and the Ministry of Construction and other six ministries identified it as one of the 1887 focus town. In 2005, the China Mining Association named Xiaotangshan as "Chinese hot springs town", and the National Steering Committee awarded it as "spiritual civilization advanced the town".

Features
 Xiaotangshan Palace, The Hot Springs and The Xiaotangshan Dragon Venture Hot Springs Plaza.
 , a hospital near Xiaotangshan hot spring, which became famous during the 2003 SARS epidemic. This saw a sudden increase in patients with the same condition and similar needs, and so an additional 'Rehabilitation Hospital' was built adjacent to the hospital site in little more than a week. The temporary structure, built of prefabricated units and with a service life of 3 years, was operational for 51 days in 2003, from April 30 to June 20. Subsequently, it was 'quietly abandoned' and in 2010 was to be demolished. It was  rebuilt due to the COVID-19 pandemic.
 Xiaotangshan Modern Agricultural Science Demonstration Park, the largest modern agricultural park in China.
 Qincheng Prison is located in Qincheng Village in Xingshou, which is located near Xiaotangshan.

See also

 Datangshan

References

External links
  Xiaotangshan website
 Changping District website

Changping District
Towns in Beijing